Tiger Raja Singh (born 15 April 1977) is an Indian politician. He was a member of the Telangana Legislative Assembly representing the Goshamahal assembly constituency in Hyderabad. He is a former member of Telugu Desam Party until he joined the Bharatiya Janata Party. He was part of the BJP until 23 August 2022 when he was suspended over allegations of insulting the Islamic Prophet Muhammad. Raja served as the party whip for Telangana when he was in Bharatiya Janata Party. On 27 Oct 2022, the Hyderabad Police claimed that 101 criminal cases had been registered against the legislator, of which 18 were related to communal offences.

Hate Speeches
 The Mini Pakistan remark
Hyderabad BJP MLA Raja Singh, who is famous for his provocative comments on May 2017 allegedly said that the Old City area in Hyderabad has turned into Mini Pakistan and made some other objectionable remarks.
 Asks Hindus in Bengal to respond like 2002 Gujarat
On July 2017, BJP MLA T Raja Singh waded in controversy by appealing to the Hindu community in the state to respond the way Hindus in Gujarat reacted in 2002. He said- 
"Today Hindus are nor not safe in West Bengal state. Hindus in Bengal should respond to people involved in communal violence as Hindus in Gujarat did. Otherwise, soon Bengal will turn into Bangladesh." 
 Hindus Must Wield Weapons
In December 2017, the Yadigir Police in Karnataka registered a case against Raja Singh, for making a provocative speech that could disturb communal harmony. He said- "Whoever comes between us and Hindu Rashtra, we will erase them, and we won't spare them. Brothers, prepare yourselves and learn to wield swords. Why do we have to learn? We have to learn to protect our religion and Hindu Rashtra. For this, every Hindu must have weapons at his house. If you don't have weapons, then you can't save yourself or your family."
 Ban the Green Book
In June 2018, Raja Singh called for a ban on the Quran, which he termed the Green Book because its verses "call for the killing of Hindus." Alleging that the 'Green Book' was the cause of terrorism in the country, he said, "When their religious texts say that Hindus should be slaughtered, how can I go for their Iftar parties? And, how can I host Iftar parties?".Later, the Rein Bazaar Police in Hyderabad registered a case against the legislator, warning him of serious consequences if he made such statements again.
 Shoot Illegal Rohingyas
In July 2018, Singh stirred controversy over his vocal anti-Muslim views, which included calling them traitors and backing the shooting of Rohingya people.He said-"If these Rohingyas and Bangladeshi illegal immigrants do not leave India respectfully, then they should be shot and eliminated. Only then will our country be safe".

 Series of calls for Violence
 On 29 January 2023 at Janakrosh Morcha rally at Dadar, Mumbai Raja Singh gave open call for violence and killing of Muslims. In response to which a show-cause notice was issued by Hyderabad police.
 On 19 Feb 2023, Singh has been accused of delivering an inflammatory address to create communal tension, at an event in Latur to celebrate the birth anniversary of Chhatrapati Shivaji Maharaj.
 On March 10, 2023 during the occasion of Shiv Jayanti - birth anniversary of Chhatrapati Shivaji Maharaj in Shrirampur town of Ahmednagar district, T Raja Singh made derogatory remarks towards the Muslim community.Taking cognizance of which Shriram Town Police had registered an offence against him under Indian Penal Code sections 295, 504 and 506. 
 On 20 March 2023, Chhatrapati Sambhajinagar police registered FIR against Raja Singh and Suresh Chavhanke under section IPS 153(A) for promoting enimity between different groups, on grounds of religion, race, place, etc. after a rampant damaging of public property and the pelting of stones by the suspects returning from the Hindu Jagarjna Rally.

Facebook ban
Singh has pending cases against him relating to his comments about Islam. On 2 September 2020, Facebook labelled Singh as a "dangerous individual" and banned him from all Facebook platforms.

Arrest
Already having a long criminal history being arrested was nothing new to Singh. He was arrested by Hyderabad Police on 23 August 2022, mere hours after his comments about Prophet Muhammad which sparked protests in Hyderabad.

Suspension
He was suspended from BJP on 23 August for allegedly violating party norms. He was released on bail the same evening but later arrested again on 25 August 2022.

References

External links 
T. Raja Singh affidavit

Living people
1977 births
People from Telangana
Bharatiya Janata Party politicians from Telangana
Telangana MLAs 2018–2023
Telangana MLAs 2014–2018